Bruce Anderson may refer to:

 Bruce Anderson (American football) (born 1944), American football linebacker
 Bruce Anderson (columnist) (born 1949), British conservative political columnist
 Bruce Anderson (soldier) (1845–1922), American Civil War soldier and Medal of Honor recipient
 Bruce W. Anderson (born 1948), American politician, educator, journalist and member of the Minnesota House of Representatives
 Bruce Anderson (politician) (born 1950), American politician and member of the Minnesota House of Representatives and the Minnesota Senate
 Bobby Dunbar (aka Charlie Bruce Anderson), American kidnap victim
 Bruce Anderson (footballer, born 1895) (1895–1957), Australian rules footballer for Geelong
 Bruce Anderson (footballer, born 1907) (1907–1965), Australian rules footballer for Essendon
 Bruce Anderson (footballer, born 1998), Scottish footballer for Livingston FC
 Bruce Anderson (publisher), publisher and editor of Anderson Valley Advertiser newspaper